Winter and Summer may refer to:

 An episode of Barney and Friends
 A Sumerian creation myth, the Debate between Winter and Summer